Daculus is a subgenus of tephritid  or fruit flies in the family Tephritidae.

References

Bactrocera
Insect subgenera